The Ordnance SBML two-inch mortar, or more commonly, just "two-inch mortar", was a British mortar issued to the British Army and the Commonwealth armies, that saw use during the Second World War and later.

It was more portable than larger mortars, and had greater range and firepower than rifle grenades. Its main purpose was to produce smoke for cover and -through high trajectory and HE shell - engage targets "immune to small arms fire"

Design
The two-inch mortar was one of a number of small mortars brought into service by European nations between the two World Wars.

Due to its small size, and for simplicity, the mortar had no forward strut or bipod like larger designs needed. The barrel was held at the correct angle by one soldier while the other loaded and fired the round. The original design had a large base plate and  sights for aiming which used spirit levels. As the design matured, the baseplate became smaller and the sights were omitted. Aiming was by eye and relied on the firer's judgment and experience. With such a short barrel the normal firing method, where the bomb was dropped down the tube and a pin in the base of the barrel struck the detonator in the tail of the bomb, would not work, so firing was by a small trigger mechanism at the breech.

The bombs were cylindrical with a (perforated) four finned tail. For the HE projectile an  impact fuze was fitted in the nose of the bomb.

Post war, the two-inch mortar was kept in service to fire smoke and illuminating rounds. It was replaced by the Royal Ordnance 51 mm infantry mortar in the late 1980s.

Specifications
Calibre: 2 inches (50.8 mm)
Length: 
Weight: 
Firing mechanism: Trip (small trigger)
Elevation: 45-90°
Range: 
Rate of fire: Eight rounds per minute

Variations

Mk I = squad-level mortar introduced in 1918 and declared obsolete in 1919.
Mk II = the first model introduced in 1938 with a large baseplate.
Mk II* = the 1938 version intended for use with the Universal Carrier
Mk II** = a second version for use with the Universal Carrier
Mk II*** = version for use by infantry at platoon level and fitted with a large baseplate
Mk III = version used as a smoke bomb launcher for tanks It was built into the turret and could fire smoke shells from 20 to 120 yards away. The range was varied by using a gas regulator to adjust the escaping propellant gases. It was aimed and fired by using a pistol grip at the back that would activate the firing pin when the trigger was pulled.  
Mk IV = limited production run and did not enter service
Mk V = not manufactured
Mk VI = not manufactured
Mk VII = for use on Universal Carriers
Mk VII* = for use by airborne forces, having a shorter barrel ( = 36 cm) and a baseplate replaced with a spade-like plate
Mk VII** = infantry use with long barrel and spade-like baseplate
Mk VIIA = Indian Army model
Mk VIII = another short-barrelled version for the airborne forces

Ammunition types

High explosive (HE):  - olive drab body, red band
White phosphorus smoke (WP Smk):  - dark green body
Titanium tetrachloride smoke (FM Smk):  - dark green body
Illumination (Ill):  - drab khaki (light OD) body
Signal multi-star (Sig): 1 lb (white 2 lb) - light stone (grey) body. The multi-star was available in white, red, green, and mixed red-green.

Ammunition was packed one 51 mm-bomb per tube, three conjoined tubes per pack (three bombs), two packs (six bombs) to a fibre container, and three fibre containers to a steel box (18 bombs total).

Modern variants
India's Ordnance Factory Board's 51mm E1 mortar is an enhanced version of the two-inch British mortar of World War II; it is still in production and service in India.

Specifications
Calibre: 51.25mm (2 in)
Weight: 4.88 kg
Range: 200-850m
Rate of fire:
normal: eight rounds per minute
high: 12 rounds per minute
Bomb weight:
High explosive: 950g (800m range)

Users 
 
 
 
 
 
  United Liberation Front of Assam
  Naxalites
 
 
 
 Myanmar Army : Inherited from British-Burma Army and also bought from India.Main Light mortar used until 1990s.
 
 People's Liberation Army, Nepal
 
 
 
: Free Norwegian forces
: Polish Armed Forces in the West
 
 
  The Mk.III (renamed the M3 Mortar) was used by the US Army on the M4 Sherman from Fall, 1943 to Spring, 1945. The vehicle's combat load was 18 smoke shells for M4 tanks with the 75mm or 76mm cannon to 12 shells for M4 assault tanks with the 105mm howitzer.

See also
Similar, World War 2-era  weapons

 37mm spade mortar
 5 cm Granatwerfer 36
 Lance Grenades de 50 mm modèle 37
 Type 89 grenade discharger

References

Bibliography 
 
 
 

World War II infantry mortars of the United Kingdom
51 mm artillery